This is a list of natural features on the Fraser River, including canyons, rapids, bars, named rocks and eddies and similar features.  Important side canyons which figure on the river's landscape are also included (e.g. Churn Creek).  Important confluences and manmade landmarks are included for reference.

Grand Canyon of the Fraser (Robson Valley)
confluence of Nechako River & City of Prince George
Fort George Canyon
Cottonwood Canyon
Confluence of the Quesnel River & City of Quesnel
Rich Bar
Red Bluff
Chimney Creek Canyon
Soda Creek Canyon
confluence of the Chilcotin River
Churn Creek Canyon
Big Bar
Chisolm Canyon
French Bar Canyon
Watson Bar
High Bar Canyon
Moran Canyon (British Columbia)
Pavilion Canyon (also refers to the adjacent canyon of lower Pavilion Creek)
Glen Fraser Canyon
Fountain Rapids (aka Upper Fountain Rapids, "the Upper Fountain")
Fountain Canyon
Mormon Bar/French Bar
Bridge River Rapids (aka Lower Fountain Rapids, Six Mile Rapids, or "the Lower Fountain"
Lillooet Canyon
Canada Bar/Canada Flat
Horsebeef Bar
various named flats at Lillooet 
confluence of Cayoosh Creek/Seton River
Seton Powerhouse
Texas Bar
Texas Flat
the Big Slide
Cameron Bar
Foster Bar
Spintlum's Flat
confluence of Thompson River/Village of Lytton
Cantilever Bar
Van Winkle Bar
Kanaka Bar
Boston Bar
Yankee Flat (North Bend)
China Bar
Hells Gate (and fishladders, suspension bridge)
Dutchman Bar
Alexandra Suspension Bridge/Kequaloose
Alexandra Bridge
Chapmans Bar
Spuzzum
Wellington Bar
Saddle Rock
Sailor Bar (officially Sailors Bar but known in the singular because of Sailor Bar Tunnel)
Lady Franklin Rock, just above Yale
Yale Bar
Hills Bar
Emory Bar
Texas Bar
Union Bar
Cornish Bar
Agassiz-Rosedale Bridge
Maria Bar
Sapperton Bar
Steveston Bar, South Arm

See also
List of islands of the Fraser River
List of crossings of the Fraser River
List of tributaries of the Fraser River

Fraser River
Canyons and gorges of British Columbia
Fraser River natural features